Kunturiri (Aymara kunturi condor, -ri nominal suffix, hispanicized spelling Condoriri) is a mountain in the Andes of Bolivia, about 4,512 metres (14,803 ft) high. It is  situated in the Oruro Department, Sajama Province, Turku Municipality, Turku Canton, northeast of Turku (Turco). The rivers Kunturiri and Phurqi Q'awa (Porkhekhaua) originate near the mountain. They flow down to Turku River, a left tributary of Lauca River.

See also
 Asu Asuni
 Sajama 
 Sajama National Park
 Wayna Potosí
List of mountains in the Andes

References 

Mountains of Oruro Department